Falcondance is the third book in The Kiesha'ra Series by Amelia Atwater-Rhodes.

Falcondance is narrated by Nicias Silvermead, a nineteen-year-old peregrine falcon raised in Wyvern's Court. Danica and Zane's dream of creating Wyvern's Court has come true. Atwater-Rhodes now moves the narration from the first generation, which ended the avian-serpiente violence, to the second generation, which will have to end the hatred between the two peoples.

Plot introduction

Nicias Silvermead is the child of Kel and Andreios, and the grandson of Araceli, heir to the falcon Empress Cjarsa. When his magic awakens he is forced to travel to Ahnmik in order to learn to control it before it kills him. On Ahnmik Nicias discovers much more than just a way to control his magic. Araceli and Cjarsa hide the shocking secret that they started the avian-serpiente war by creating the avians through the human child Alasdair and giving half of Anhamirak's magic to them. He also finds Hai, half gyrfalcon and half cobra, she is the child of Anjay Cobriana and first in line to the serpiente throne. In between these powerful players and the seduction and deception of the falcon island, Nicias must try to find a way to return home, if he can.

Plot summary
Nicias is the child of Kel and Andreios, resident falcons of Wyvern's Court. He is the best friend and guard of Oliza Shardae Cobriana, Arami of the serpiente and heir to the Tuuli Thea.

After Nicias's falcon magic awakens he is left with two frightening options: stay in Wyvern's Court and hope he will be able to control his magic so it won't kill him, or travel to Ahnmik, the island where his parents were raised but later fled. Nicias's choice is soon made for him, after a frightening dream in which a cobra tries to strangle him. He wakes up to find his ribs aching and his breathing painful. His magic is clearly out of his control and he has to go.

However, bringing him to Ahnmik also means bringing him to Araceli, Nicias's grandmother and the woman both of his parents fear above anything else in the world. Before Nicias leaves, his father Andreios shows him the scars that Araceli left on him in her anger about giving him up. He warns Nicias about the infinite cruelty of the white city, and about the torture that awaits those who do not show complete loyalty for the Empress Cjarsa.

When Nicias arrives in Ahnmik, he finds it very different from the hell his father informed him about. Araceli appears to be affectionate, wise, and sad about what happened between her and her son. She explains the terrible scars on Andreios's skin as something that was necessary to keep his power from destroying him while he lived away from Ahnmik. The white city also does not appear dangerous or cruel. Its beautiful white roads are soft as carpets, and they sing to all who have falcon magic. The falcons' sky dances are beautiful and captivating. Nobody appears to be tortured or afraid. Also, Lillian's friendship with Nicias gradually becomes something more.  The closer they grow, the less evil Nicias sees in Ahnmik.

The only thing marring the beauty of Ahnmik are the shm'Ecl. Held in a violet tower and guarded by Servos, one of the member of the royal family of Ahnmik, the shm'Ecl are a painful reminder of the dangers of falcon magic. Ecl is the Void, it is the absence of even nothingness that surrounds Mehay (existence). This is where falcons flee when their magic overwhelms them or they enter Ecl as an escape from the pain of the mortal world. Darien appears to be one of the shm'Ecl and nothing more. However, she has not succumbed completely to oblivion, and calls to Nicias in his dreams, asking him to come to her, and telling him to beware of the falcons and Araceli. Nicias manages to ignore her calls for several days, but eventually he goes.

In Darien, he finds the key to the truth about many things. Darien was once Kel's best friend and partner in Cjarsa's Mercy, and together they found out a horrible secret Cjarsa and Araceli hid. The knowledge of their secret was why Darien succumbed to Ecl, to escape the execution and torture that awaited her in return for knowing, and for daring to tell what she knew. And that was why Kel fled the island, unable to live with what she had learned and unable to torture Darien to death as Ahnmik's laws dictated.

The avians and serpiente had been fighting for thousands of years. Nobody remembered how the fighting got started, except the falcons. The avians and the  both have differing views on how the war began.  Avian history says that the serpiente killed Alasdair first, but serpiente history says that the avian guards slaughtered the serpiente, thus beginning the long war. Both these versions are true, and the responsibility for all of these events lies squarely at the feet of the falcon Empress and her Heir, Araceli.

When Anjay Cobriana travelled to Ahnmik to seek the falcon's aid in the avian-serpiente war, he developed a close relationship with Darien. In fact, he was Hai's father. After he left, she kept an eye on him, and she was watching when he rode to the Hawk's Keep with the intent of killing Nacola and Danica Shardae. She was watching when Xavier Shardae stabbed her lover in the back, causing the avian poison concocted by Araceli to start killing him. Darien called on Cjarsa to help Anjay, but Araceli refused, saying that it wasn't the falcon's fight. When Araceli lied to her, the twists in the falcons' magic allowed Darien and everyone in the room with her at the time to see the truth.

When the coven of the Dasi split, the magic of both the serpents and the falcons, which had once balanced each other, became unstable. The falcons' magic balanced itself, as it is the magic of stillness and silence, bringing anyone overcome by their magic to Ecl. The serpents' magic, however, was more unstable, as it was the magic of reckless freedom and chaos, with much power to destroy everything around them. Cjarsa saw danger in this destructiveness and so, in a period of recklessness, she dived into Ecl and manipulated fate to take away a part of the serpent's magic. This part was unable to be destroyed, and the falcons were afraid of what the serpiente would do if they were to discover the truth. So Cjarsa and Araceli took in a human girl. They taught her magic, giving to her and, thus, all her descendants, the part of the serpents' magic they had removed. This girl, Alasdair, was the first avian. With the falcons' help, she quickly became led her people to prosperity. Although they are drawn together, since each of them was the missing half of the other's magical powers, Araceli had made sure that the avians were created as the exact opposite of the serpiente, strict and controlled, so that the two cultures could never blend together without one of them being destroyed. This was to prevent the reunition of Anhamirak's powers, as that could cause great chaos and eventually destroy both their worlds. Araceli then used persuasion magics on Kiesha to make her stab Alasdair in the back, and manipulated the minds of Alasdair's guards so that they would retaliate instantly and violently by killing the serpiente leaders. And then the war between the two sides began, and it would not be ended for another few thousand years.

Darien, Kel, Lillian, and a few others learned this truth the night Anjay Cobriana died. Araceli wanted them executed but Cjarsa protected them. Darien tried to share her knowledge with the rest of the falcon world and was arrested. Kel, not being able to inflict the Empress's violent punishment on Darien, the person she loved most, fled from the island and Darien gave herself to Ecl rather than face Cjarsa's punishment. Lillian forced herself to forget. She became the head of the Elite Silver Choir, Araceli's Mercy, now that the previous two favorites were out of the way.

After Nicias learns of this, he turns on the falcon empire. He only wants to return to his home in Wyvern's Court, even if he is an outcast there. Darien agrees to help him escape Ahnmik, but only if Nicias will bring her half-serpiente daughter, Hai, back to Wyvern's Court. Hai gave herself to Ecl after having her wings broken when she was a dancer. As she had no bonds in the mortal world to hold her, she surrendered completely to Ecl and gave up her life of pain.

Nicias returns to Wyvern's Court with his magic under control. Besides the knowledge of truth, Darien had also taught him about Ecl. If one enters Ecl out of free will and without fear, they can control their magic easily.  Moreover, Nicias has royal blood, which makes it easier for him. After learning how to better control his magic, Nicias can now survive away from Ahnmik, and he is eager to do so.

However, there are a few serious obstacles in the way of  his return. Araceli has not agreed to let him go, and having let go of her own son Sebastian, she is  reluctant to give up her grandson so easily. The falcons also think that Wyvern's Court is doomed, as Oliza's children will have the full powers of Anhamirak and the magic will overwhelm them and eventually destroy their world.

When Nicias returns to Wyvern's Court, Oliza is worried that she has stolen the throne from Hai, as Anjay Cobriana, Hai's father, was the older brother of Oliza's father, Zane Cobriana and so Hai is the rightful Arami of the serpiente.  However, Nicias reassures her by saying that Hai is lost in Ecl and it is unlikely that she will ever return.

Out of fear for Oliza's safety, Nicias returns to Ahnmik to find that Cjarsa has requested an audience with him. Cjarsa explains about the danger of a race with Anhamirak's magic without the balance of Ahnmik around to control it and tries to give some justification for starting the avian-serpiente war. Then Araceli bursts in and confronts Cjarsa. Araceli is power-hungry with no sense of balance and has been planning to topple Cjarsa for a long time, as Nicias stands between the two women he discovers a shocking secret: Syfka.

Syfka, an aplomado, is the third in line of the hierarchy from the Dasi coven. When Araceli's son Sebastian was young she helped him flee the island and become Andreios. She has also proven herself to be helpful when she helped Kel and Andreios return to the avians and serpiente after Araceli abducted them. On top of that she gave Nicias the opportunities he needed to speak to Darien and get out of the city with Hai. But the falcons never do anything that they will not gain from, and Syfka is no exception to this.

As Araceli's magic flows over him, Darien instructs him to find a pattern which she suspects exists but she is unable to see as she is not of royal blood. Inside Araceli's magic, Nicias discovers incredibly subtle and discreet persuasion magics of the same kind that Lilian used on him to keep him from seeing the evil of Ahnmik. These were woven by Syfka, who had been planning on using Araceli to destroy Cjarsa. In the process Araceli would also have been destroyed and as third in line to the throne, Syfka would have ruled Ahnmik. Araceli's children were in line before her and so she did everything she could to help both Sebastian and Nicias leave the island. She almost succeeded but Nicias exposes her magic. Lillian and Araceli instantly retaliate, and Syfka is immediately taken into custody.

Nicias then receives permission to leave Ahnmik and return to Wyvern's Court, on the condition that any children he has must be with another peregrine falcon. On his return he discovers that the vow Hai made to him, a promise to try to return from Ecl, has produced results. Hai is awake, and she is every bit as powerful as the gyrfalcon and the cobra in her combined. Oliza is no longer the first in line to the serpiente throne, and Wyvern's Court future is uncertain.

Sequel
The sequel to Falcondance is Wolfcry

2005 American novels
American fantasy novels
Novels by Amelia Atwater-Rhodes

Nyeusigrube